Sarsaz (Harıhaź) is a rural locality (a village) in Podlubovsky Selsoviet, Karmaskalinsky District, Bashkortostan, Russia. The population was 90 as of 2010. There are 2 streets.

Geography 
Sarsaz is located 23 km northwest of Karmaskaly (the district's administrative centre) by road. Suuk-Chishma is the nearest rural locality.

References 

Rural localities in Karmaskalinsky District